Michael Devine (born 19 March 1973) is an Irish former professional footballer.

Early career
Devine began playing football with Springfield FC in Cobh, County Cork, where he was capped at U15 and U16 levels, and thereafter signed for English team Middlesbrough. Devine spent four years at Ayresome Park learning his trade before he briefly moved on to Newcastle United and non-league Northallerton. He returned to Ireland to link up with Cobh Wanderers and subsequently joined League of Ireland First Division club Cobh Ramblers.

League of Ireland Premier Division
Devine made his Cobh debut in August 1993 as a substitute against Cork City in a League Cup tie. He joined League of Ireland Premier Division club Waterford United in 1998 and immediately impressed, later earning a then club record £30,000 transfer to Cork City. The transfer came as City and manager Derek Mountfield were in need of a keeper following a training ground injury to first choice 'keeper Noel Mooney, and Devine's form saw him retain the goalkeeper's jersey even after Mooney returned to full fitness. Noted for excellent shot stopping and spectacular saves, Devine became the "closed door" behind City's defence, eventually winning the League of Ireland championship in 2005 with many critics speculating on a senior Ireland call-up.

He returned to the Blues in January 2009.
He then signed for Cork City in March 2010. . He left the club later that year. In January 2018, he announced his retirement.

Honours

Club
Cork City
League of Ireland: 2005
FAI Cup: 2007
Setanta Sports Cup: 2008

Individual
SWAI Goalkeeper of the Year: 2005

References

External links
 Extratime.ie: Devine rejects new Cork City contract
 Extratime.ie Devine and Duggan link up with Cork

1973 births
Living people
Republic of Ireland association footballers
Association football goalkeepers
League of Ireland players
Middlesbrough F.C. players
Newcastle United F.C. players
Cobh Ramblers F.C. players
Waterford F.C. players
Cork City F.C. players